"What You Do (Bastard)" is New Zealand band Stellar*'s second single, and their first single from their debut album Mix. The single includes two remixes of the title track. It reached number 17 on RIANZ.

Track listing

References

Stellar (New Zealand band) songs
1998 singles
1998 songs
Songs written by Boh Runga
Sony BMG singles